Fraxinus dubia is a plant species native to Mexico and Central America. It has been reported from Guatemala, Belize, Honduras, Costa Rica, Chiapas and Veracruz.

Fraxinus dubia is a tree up to 11 m (37 feet) tall. Leaves are thick, evergreen, glabrous, up to 15 cm (8 inches) long, (1-)5-9-foliate. Flowers are borne in panicles up to 4 cm (1.6 inches) long. Fruits are about 2.5 cm (1.0 inches) long with oblanceolate wings, the part of the fruit containing the seed about 8 mm (0.3 inches) long.

References

dubia
Trees of Chiapas
Trees of Veracruz
Trees of Central America
Plants described in 1991